Chalcosyrphus armatipes is a species of hoverfly in the family Syrphidae.

Distribution
Brazil.

References

Eristalinae
Insects described in 1941
Diptera of South America
Taxa named by Charles Howard Curran